Sniff may refer to:

 Sniff (Moomin character), a character in the Moomin stories
 Sniff (film), a 2017 Indian Bollywood film
 Sniff, the action of inhaling
 Sniff, odor sampling, see olfaction
 Sniff (domino game), a domino game of the Fives family